Western Slovenia (Zahodna Slovenija) is one of the two NUTS-2 Regions of Slovenia.  The region forms the western part of the country and includes the cities of Ljubljana, Koper, Kranj and Nova Gorica.  It is the wealthier of the two regions of Slovenia.

Western Slovenia (SI02) is divided into the following statistical regions:

 Central Slovenia
 Upper Carniola
 Gorizia
 Coastal–Karst

References

NUTS 2 statistical regions of Slovenia
NUTS 2 statistical regions of the European Union